Youri Chassin is a Canadian politician, who was elected to the National Assembly of Quebec in the 2018 provincial election. He represents the electoral district of Saint-Jérôme as a member of the Coalition Avenir Québec.

Chassin worked as a researcher and economist with the Montreal Economic Institute, in November 2010 to March 2017. Prior to this, he was an economic analyst at the Quebec Employers Council (CPQ) and an economist at the Center for Interuniversity Research and Analysis on Organizations (CIRANO). His interest in public policy issues goes back to his university days during which he collaborated with the Quebec Federation of University Students (FEUQ), with the Conseil permanent de la jeunesse and with Force Jeunesse.

In December 2020, Chassin was found to have traveled overseas despite public health orders to avoid nonessential travel overseas. Chassin claimed his trip was to see his husband who lived in Peru and that it was essential and not a vacation, saying "In other circumstances, I would not have come to Peru, but this is a special case." The trip was pre-approved by Quebec Premier François Legault.

He is openly gay.

References

Living people
Coalition Avenir Québec MNAs
People from Saint-Jérôme
21st-century Canadian politicians
Canadian LGBT people in provincial and territorial legislatures
Gay politicians
Year of birth missing (living people)
21st-century Canadian LGBT people
Canadian gay men